The South African Army maintains a wide variety of military equipment.

Infantry weapons

Pistols

Submachine guns

Rifles

Shotguns

Machine guns

Grenade launchers and grenades

Anti-tank weapons

Man-portable surface-to-air missiles

Mortars

Armoured vehicles

Logistics and utility vehicles

Artillery and anti-aircraft

Howitzers

Rocket artillery

Air defence

Miscellaneous equipment

Future equipment

See also 
List of equipment of the South African National Defence Force

South African Air Force

South African Navy

South African Special Forces

List of South African military bases

References

Military equipment of South Africa
South African Army
South Africa
Equipment